Bhisiana is a census town in Bathinda district  in the state of Punjab, India.

Demographics
 India census, Bhisiana had a population of 4775. Males constitute 59% of the population and females 41%. Bhisiana has an average literacy rate of 75%, higher than the national average of 59.5%; with male literacy of 78% and female literacy of 69%. 15% of the population is under 6 years of age.

Bhisiana Air port
Bhisiana air force base is one of the most strategically important bases in India, including a UAV unit.

References

Bathinda
Cities and towns in Bathinda district